Carousel One is the 14th studio album by Canadian musician Ron Sexsmith. It was released in March 2015 under Compass Records. The title is a reference to the luggage retrieval belt at Los Angeles airport where bags from flights from Toronto are delivered.

Critical reception

Kyle Mullin of Exclaim! praised Sexsmith's notably more upbeat sound and attitude on the record, writing that his "days of being pigeonholed as a sad sack are long gone."

Track listing

References

2015 albums
Ron Sexsmith albums
Compass Records albums